Ode to Echo is the fourteenth studio album by American progressive rock band Glass Hammer, released on March 11, 2014.

It is the first album with drummer Aaron Raulston, and marks the return of former vocalists Carl Groves and Susie Bogdanowicz. Groves wasn't featured in a Glass Hammer album since Culture of Ascent in 2007, and Bogdanowicz's last album with the band was Three Cheers for the Broken-Hearted in 2009; in the three previous albums, all lead vocals were sung by new singer Jon Davison.

Ode to Echo is also notable for featuring all the full-time vocalists in Glass Hammer history with Groves, Davison, Bogdanowicz, session member (and former full-time vocalist) Walter Moore sharing lead vocals, while band leaders Steve Babb and Fred Schendel (who sang lead vocals in some of the band's works) and original Glass Hammer singer Michelle Young provided backing vocals.

Track listing

Personnel 

Glass Hammer
 Carl Groves – lead vocals
 Jon Davison – lead and backing vocals
 Susie Bogdanowicz – lead and backing vocals
 Alan Shikoh – electric acoustic and classical guitars, electric sitar
 Steve Babb – bass, keyboards, backing vocals
 Fred Schendel –  keyboards, guitars, backing vocals
 Aaron Raulston – drums

Production
 Fred Schendel and Steve Babb – Record producer
 Bob Katz – mastering
 Michał Xaay Loranc – cover, artwork, logo design
 Julie Babb – administration, band photography
 Bret Noblitt – precision audio

Additional musicians
 Walter Moore – vocals
 Michelle Young – backing vocals
 Randy Jackson – guitar and backing vocals on "Crowbone"
 David Ragsdale – violin on "Crowbone"
 Rob Reed – piano and first Minimoog solo on "Misantrog"

References 

Glass Hammer albums
2014 albums